John Fidge (born 4 May 1966) is a former Australian rules footballer who played with Melbourne and the Brisbane Bears in the Victorian Football League (VFL) during the 1980s. He also played for Glenelg in the South Australian National Football League (SANFL).

Fidge made his VFL debut as a 17-year-old centre half forward in 1984, starring with four goals and 23 disposals in a loss to Essendon. He finished his first season with 27 goals from 12 appearances, missing games mid year with a knee injury. Recruited from St Peter's, East Bentleigh, he played 16 times in 1985 and booted six goals against North Melbourne at the MCG, his best return for Melbourne. It was also the first year where he played games with his brother Ted at Melbourne. He suffered from stress fractures in his foot during 1986 but kicked 12 goals from his four games.

He was one of many VFL players to join the new Brisbane Bears team for their inaugural season in 1987 and played in every one of their first eight games. Late in the season he kicked six goals against Fitzroy to equal his career best and followed it up the following week with five goals and six behinds against his former club. Injuries returned in 1988 and Fidge, who had an icy relationship with coach Peter Knights, was sacked a few games into the 1989 season.

For the rest of 1989, Fidge played with Glenelg in the SANFL. He was selected by the Sydney Swans in the 1989 VFL Draft but chose to remain in South Australia. His decision to stay at Glenelg in 1990 paid off, as he kicked 124 goals for the year, five of them in the Grand Final loss to Port Adelaide. Despite his large goal tally for the season he did not take home the Ken Farmer Medal, which went to Scott Hodges of Port Adelaide who kicked 153 goals.

Fidge was picked up by Essendon with the 24th pick of the 1990 AFL Draft, but he did not play a VFL game for them and returned to Glenelg.

He again topped Glenelg's goal-kicking in 1992 with 92 goals and once more finished second in the league. Glenelg made the Grand Final once again, but Fidge's four goals were not enough to get them over the line. The following year he kicked a more modest 56 goals but it saw him top his club's goal-kicking for the third and final time. Fidge spent the 1994 season with Victorian Football League (VFL) side Frankston before retiring.

References

1966 births
Australian rules footballers from Victoria (Australia)
Melbourne Football Club players
Brisbane Bears players
Glenelg Football Club players
Living people
Frankston Football Club players